Leo von Klenze (Franz Karl Leopold von Klenze; 29 February 1784, Buchladen (Bockelah / Bocla) near Schladen – 26 January 1864, Munich) was a German neoclassicist architect, painter and writer. Court architect of Bavarian King Ludwig I, Leo von Klenze was one of the most prominent representatives of Greek revival style.

Biography
Von Klenze studied architecture and public building finance under Friedrich Gilly in Berlin, and worked as an apprentice to Charles Percier and Pierre François Léonard Fontaine in Paris. Between 1808 and 1813 he was a court architect of Jérôme Bonaparte, King of Westphalia.  Later he moved to Bavaria and in 1816 began to work as court architect of Ludwig I. The King's passion for Hellenism shaped the architectural style of von Klenze. He built many neoclassical buildings in Munich, including the Ruhmeshalle and Monopteros temple.  On Königsplatz he designed probably the best known modern Hellenistic architectural ensemble.  Near Regensburg he built the Walhalla temple, named after Valhalla, the home of gods in Norse mythology.

When Greece won its independence, Ludwig I's son Otto became the country's first king.  Von Klenze was invited to Athens to submit plans of city reconstruction in the style of Ancient Greece.  Russian Emperor Nicholas I commissioned von Klenze in 1838 to design a building for the New Hermitage, a public museum that housed the Romanov collection of antiquities, paintings, coins and medals, cameos, prints and drawings, and books.  Prior to this, von Klenze had also designed and arranged museum galleries in Munich, including the Glyptothek, Ludwig I's museum for antique sculpture, and the Alte Pinakothek, a painting gallery for the pictures of the Wittelsbach collection.

Von Klenze was not only an architect, but also an accomplished painter and draughtsman. In many of his paintings ancient buildings were depicted.  Those served as models for his own architectural projects. Klenze studied ancient architecture during his travels to Italy and Greece.  He also participated in excavations of ancient buildings in Athens and submitted proposals for the restoration of the Acropolis.

Klenze collected works of important contemporary German painters.  He sold his collection, including 58 landscapes and genre paintings, to King Ludwig I in 1841.  These paintings form the core of the Neue Pinakothek museum's collection.

Von Klenze married Maria Felicitas Blangini (1790–1844) a beauty at the court of Ludwig I. Their granddaughter Irene Athenais von Klenze became Countess Courten (1850–1916).

Von Klenze died in 1864 and was buried in the Alter Südfriedhof in Munich.

Paintings
 Landscape with the Castle of Massa di Carrara, 1827
 Reconstruction of the Acropolis and Areopagus in Athens, 1846
 Der Camposanto in Pisa
 Landschaft auf Capri
 Der Kreuzgang von San Giovanni in Laterano in Rom
 Der Palazzo Rufolo in Ravello
 Porto Venere on the Gulf of La Spezia
 Reconstructed view of Athens
 Der Domplatz in Amalfi
 Panorama of Tivoli from a Loggia

Architectural works
In Munich (München):
 Glyptothek (1816–1830)
 Alte Pinakothek (1826–1836)
 Residenz – Königsbau, Festsaalbau and the Allerheiligen-Hofkirche (1826–1842)
 Monopteros temple in Englischer Garten (1836)
 Propyläen Gate (1846–1862)
 Ruhmeshalle (1850)
 Monopteros in the park of Nymphenburg Palace
 Ludwigstrasse, Odeonsplatz and adjacent Wittelsbacherplatz
 Ballhouse in Wilhelmshöhe castle park, (Kassel) (1809–1810)
 Ismaning castle (1816) built for a stepson of Napoleon, Eugène de Beauharnais, and his spouse.
 Walhalla temple near Regensburg (1816–1842)
 Neues Schloss (New Palace) at Pappenheim (1819–1820)
 New Hermitage in Saint Petersburg, Russia (1839–1852)
 Catholic church of St. Dionysios the Areopagite in Athens, Greece (1853–1865)
 Befreiungshalle in Kelheim (1863)

See also
:Category:Leo von Klenze buildings
Neoclassical architecture

References

Further reading

External links

 

Architects of the Bavarian court
19th-century German architects
19th-century German painters
19th-century German male artists
German male painters
German neoclassical painters
Greek Revival architects
Recipients of the Pour le Mérite (civil class)
German neoclassical architects
Recipients of the Royal Gold Medal
1784 births
1864 deaths
Burials at the Alter Südfriedhof
People from Wolfenbüttel (district)